Çatak (Šatax) is a district of Van Province of Turkey, near the border with Iran. As mayor Abdurrahman Şeylan from the Justice and Development Party (AKP) was elected in the local elections in March 2019, Ekrem Çeçen is the current Kaymakam.

Two people were killed in a bomb explosion at an outdoor cafe in south-east Turkey, police stated on September 4, 2006. It followed a series of bombings in the last week of August 2006, at Turkish resorts and in Istanbul, that killed at least three people.

A separatist militant group, the Kurdistan Freedom Hawks (TAK), has said it carried out those attacks. Its website warned on August 29, 2006 that it would turn "Turkey into hell". The group, which is said to be linked to the outlawed Kurdistan Workers' Party (PKK), called on foreign tourists not to travel to the country.

Turkish media said a remote-controlled bomb in Çatak was detonated as police arrived to investigate a suspicious package. One of the two people killed was a police officer, the state-run Anadolu Agency reported. A local official said the bomb had been placed in a rubbish bin.

References

Towns in Turkey
Populated places in Van Province
Districts of Van Province
Kurdish settlements in Turkey